The Atwood Stories was a Canadian television drama series, which aired on W in 2003. A short-run dramatic anthology series produced by Shaftesbury Films, the series dramatized six short stories by Margaret Atwood. It was one of the first original Canadian drama series ever commissioned by the network.

The series was a Gemini Award nominee for Best Drama Series at the 18th Gemini Awards.

The following year, Shaftesbury produced The Shields Stories, a similar series which dramatized six short stories by another Canadian writer, Carol Shields.

Episodes

References

External links
 

2000s Canadian drama television series
2003 Canadian television series debuts
2003 Canadian television series endings
Television series by Shaftesbury Films
Films based on works by Margaret Atwood
2000s Canadian anthology television series
W Network original programming